Euphaedra disjuncta is a butterfly in the family Nymphalidae. It is found in the Democratic Republic of the Congo and the Central African Republic.

Subspecies
Euphaedra disjuncta disjuncta (Democratic Republic of the Congo, Central African Republic)
Euphaedra disjuncta virens Hecq, 1984 (Democratic Republic of the Congo: Shaba)

References

Butterflies described in 1981
disjuncta